William Murrell (died February 7, 1892) was a minister in the African Methodist Episcopal (A.M.E.) church and a state legislator in Louisiana. He was born into slavery and was the son of his mother's owner. His ownership was transferred and he was sold on several occasions. He helped establish several churches. He served several terms during the Reconstruction era representing Lafourche in the Louisiana House of Representatives.

He was identified as from Madison, Louisiana in the Fifth Congressional District at the 1873 State Colored Men's Convention.

References

Members of the Louisiana House of Representatives
Year of birth missing
1892 deaths
African Methodist Episcopal Church clergy
African-American state legislators in Louisiana
American freedmen
People from Lafourche Parish, Louisiana
19th-century American politicians
African-American politicians during the Reconstruction Era